Howard Walker may refer to:

 Howard Walker (ice hockey), Canadian ice hockey player
 Howard Walker (politician), American politician from Michigan
 Howard Kent Walker, US diplomat